Ventura County Christian School is a private, nondenominational Christian school in Ventura, California.  VCCS began in 1994 as a high school only (Grades 9–12). In 2003 it began hosting all grades K-12, and moved to a separate building on MacMillan Avenue. It currently has approximately 90 high school students, and an average class size of 15 students.

External links
 Official site

Christian schools in California
Nondenominational Christian schools in the United States
High schools in Ventura County, California
Private high schools in California
1994 establishments in California